JSC "2nd Sverdlovsk Air Enterprise"() was a second level airline based in Yekaterinburg, Russia. It was founded in 1993 and continued to operate for 18 years until closing down in 2011.

Fleet
As of May 2007 the 2nd Sverdlovsk Air Enterprise fleet includes:

References

External links 

 Uktus-Avia (ex-2nd Sverdlovsk Air Enterprise) official website.
  77 years of Uktus Airport

Defunct airlines of Russia
Companies based in Yekaterinburg
Former Aeroflot divisions
Aviation in Sverdlovsk Oblast
Airlines established in 1993
Airlines disestablished in 2011